Pinang may refer to:
Areca nut
Penang, state in Malaysia
Pangkal Pinang, Indonesia
Pinang, Tangerang, a district of Tangerang City, Banten, Indonesia
Tanjung Pinang, Indonesia